The Human Poverty Index (HPI) was an indication of the poverty of community in a country, developed by the United Nations to complement the Human Development Index (HDI) and was first reported as part of the Human Deprivation Report in 1997. It is developed by United Nations Development Program which also publishes indexes like HDI It was considered to better reflect the extent of deprivation in deprived countries compared to the HDI. In 2010, it was supplanted by the UN's Multidimensional Poverty Index.

The HPI concentrates on the deprivation in the three essential elements of human life already reflected in the HDI: longevity, knowledge and a decent standard of living. The HPI is derived separately for developing countries (HPI-1) and a group of select high-income OECD countries (HPI-2) to better reflect socio-economic differences and also the widely different measures of deprivation in the two groups.

For developing countries (HPI-1) 
The Human Development Reports website summarizes this as "A composite index measuring deprivations in the three basic dimensions captured in the human development index—a long and healthy life, knowledge and a decent standard of living." The formula for calculating it is:

 HPI-1 =

For selected high-income OECD countries (HPI-2) 
The Human Development Reports website summarizes this as "A composite index measuring deprivations in the four basic dimensions captured in the human development index—a long and healthy life, knowledge and a decent standard of living—and also capturing social exclusion." The formula for calculating it is:

 HPI-2 = 

The last report, 2007–2008, only has a ranking for 19 of the 22 countries with the highest Human Development Index. The ranking is as follows (with the country with the lowest amount of poverty at the top):

The countries ranked in the top 22 by HPI that are not on this list are Iceland, New Zealand and Liechtenstein.

Not all countries are included in this ranking because data are not always available. The ranks of many countries, especially those at the bottom, could drop considerably if the list included more countries. For information about the component values for countries other than the ones on the list, see source links below.

Indicators used are:

 Probability at birth of not surviving to age 60 (% of cohort), 2000–2005. Varies from 7.1% for Japan to 11.8% for the USA. This is the indicator that is best known for all countries (including the ones not on the list).  The US has specific values associated with disease characteristics of poverty.  Worse values start only at position 35 of the HDI, indicating that many countries could climb on an extended list based on this, knocking down lower ranked countries on the above list.
 People lacking functional literacy skills (% of people scoring in the range called "Level 1" in the International Adult Literacy Survey, age 16–65, 1994–2003). Varies from 7.5% for Sweden to 47.0% for Italy. These figures are higher than most commonly cited illiteracy rates due to the choice of the literacy test.
 Long-term unemployment (12 months or more, % of labour force), 2005. Varies from 0.4% for the United States to 5.0% for Germany. This indicator has by far the greatest variation, with a value as high as 9.3% at HDI position 37.
 Population below 50% of median adjusted household disposable income (%), 1994–2002. Varies from 5.4% for Finland to 17% for the US.

See also
 Indices

 Bhutan GNH Index
 Broad measures of economic progress
 Disability-adjusted life year
 Full cost accounting
 Green national product
 Green gross domestic product (Green GDP)
 Gender-related Development Index
 Genuine Progress Indicator (GPI)
 Global Peace Index
 Gross National Happiness
 Gross National Well-being (GNW)
 Happiness economics
 Happy Planet Index (HPI)
 Human Development Index (HDI)
 
 ISEW (Index of sustainable economic welfare)
 Legatum Prosperity Index
 Leisure satisfaction
 Living planet index
 Millennium Development Goals (MDGs)
 Money-rich, time-poor
 OECD Better Life Index BLI
 Subjective life satisfaction
 Where-to-be-born Index
 Wikiprogress
 World Happiness Report (WHR)
 World Values Survey (WVS)

 Other

 Economics
 Democracy Ranking
 Demographic economics
 Economic development
 Ethics of care
 Human Development and Capability Association
 Progress (history)
 Progressive utilization theory
 Post-materialism
 Psychometrics
 International Association for Feminist Economics
 International development
 Sustainable development
 System of National Accounts
 Welfare economics

References

External links
 https://web.archive.org/web/20120115005625/http://hdr.undp.org/en/statistics/understanding/indices/hpi/
 UNITED NATIONS DEVELOPMENT PROGRAMME: Human Development Reports
 Human Development Reports 2007/2008

Measurements and definitions of poverty
Welfare economics
International rankings